Agalmatophilia is a paraphilia involving sexual attraction to a statue, doll, mannequin, or other similar figurative object. The attraction may include a desire for actual sexual contact with the object, a fantasy of having sexual (or non-sexual) encounters with an animate or inanimate instance of the preferred object, the act of watching encounters between such objects, or sexual pleasure gained from thoughts of being transformed or transforming another into the preferred object. Agalmatophilia overlaps Pygmalionism, the love for an object of one's own creation, named after the myth of Pygmalion. Agalmatophilia is a form of object sexuality. English poet Edmund Spenser wrote of Pygmalionism in some of his works.

Clinical study
Agalmatophilia is a twentieth-century term for a medicalization of statue-eroticization widely attested in late eighteenth- and nineteenth-century legal medicine. Actual historical cases are few. Krafft-Ebing recorded in 1877 the case of a gardener falling in love with a statue of the Venus de Milo and being discovered attempting coitus with it.

See also

 Doll fetish
 Gynoid
 Human furniture
 Living statue
 Objectum
 Robot fetishism
 Sex doll
 Sexual objectification
 Tableau vivant

References

Bibliography

 Alexandre, Elisabeth (2005). Des poupées et des hommes. Enquête sur l'amour artificiel (Dolls and Men - Investigation into Artificial Love). La Musardine. .
 Dorfman, Elena (2005). Still Lovers. Channel Photographics. .
 Ellis, Havelock (1927). Studies in the Psychology of Sex. "Volume V: Erotic Symbolism; The Mechanism of Detumescence; The Psychic State in Pregnancy". .
 Gross, Kenneth (1992). The Dream of the Moving Statue. Cornell University Press. .
 Kick, Russ (2005). Everything You Know about Sex Is Wrong. The Disinformation Company. .
 Krafft-Ebing, Richard von (1906). Psychopathia Sexualis, with Special Reference to the Antipathic Sexual Instinct: A Medico-Forensic Study. .
 Plumb, Suzie (Editor) (2005). Guys and Dolls: Art, Science, Fashion and relationships. Royal Pavilion, Art Gallery & Museums. .
 Scobie A, Taylor J. (January 1975). Journal of the History of the Behavioral Sciences: Vol 11, Issue 1: "Agalmatophilia, the statue syndrome." Wiley Periodicals, Inc.
 Simmons, Laurence (2006). Freud's Italian Journey. Rodopi. .
 Wenk, Silke (1989). "Pygmalions Wahlverwandtschaften. Die Rekonstruktion des Schöpfermythos im nachfaschistischen Deutschland" IN: Konstruktionen von Männlichkeit und Weiblichkeit in Kunst und Kunstgeschichte. Berlin.
 White, M. J. (November 1978). Journal of Sex Research; Vol. 14, Issue 4: "The Statue Syndrome: Perversion? Fantasy? Anecdote?".

External links
 "Just Like a Woman" - Salon.com article describing cultural phenomenon of RealDolls
 "Real Dolls: Love in the Age of Silicone" - original, more detailed version of the Salon article
 The Technosexuality, Pygmalionist & Mind Control Fetish FAQ 3.0
 Lars and the Real Girl at IMDB. A delusional young guy strikes up an unconventional relationship with a doll he finds on the Internet.

Paraphilias
Sexual fetishism